Couhaib Driouech (born 17 April 2002) is a Dutch professional footballer who plays as a forward for Eredivisie club Excelsior.

Club career
Driouech made his professional debut for Eredivisie side Heerenveen on 19 September 2020 against Fortuna Sittard. He came on as a stoppage time substitute for Arjen van der Heide as Heerenveen won 3–1.

On 31 August 2021, he signed a three-year contract with Excelsior in the Eerste Divisie.

Personal life
Born in the Netherlands, Driouech is of Moroccan descent.

Career statistics

References

2002 births
People from Drachten
Footballers from Friesland
Living people
Dutch footballers
Dutch people of Moroccan descent
Association football forwards
SC Heerenveen players
Excelsior Rotterdam players
Eredivisie players
Eerste Divisie players